Chelsea Royce Tavares is an American actress and singer. She is best known for her roles as Cranberry on the Nickelodeon series Unfabulous, Autumn Williams on the Nickelodeon series Just Jordan, Patience Roberts in The CW series All American, and the voice and motion capture for Nora Harris in the video game The Last of Us Part II.

Early life
Chelsea Royce Tavares was born in the Panorama City neighborhood of Los Angeles. Her ancestors were from Brava, Cape Verde. Her younger sister is Kylee Russell, also an actress who starred as Karin Daniels in the 2007 Disney television film Jump In!

Career
Prior to appearing in Unfabulous, Tavares guest starred in the series The District and The Practice. In 2004, she joined Unfabulous as a recurring cast member in the first season before becoming a series regular the final two seasons. Shortly after, she joined the main cast of another Nickelodeon series Just Jordan, in the show's second and final season. Her other television acting credits include Zeke and Luther, CSI: Miami, The Middle, and Ringer. In 2011, she appeared in the feature film Fright Night. She is currently starring as Patience Roberts in the hit CW Network's series, All American. In video games, she voiced Glory in Fallout 4 and voiced and mo-capped Nora Harris in The Last of Us Part II.

Filmography

Film

Television

Video games

Discography

References

External links

21st-century American actresses
Actresses from Los Angeles
American child actresses
American film actresses
American musicians of Cape Verdean descent
American television actresses
American voice actresses
Living people
People from Panorama City, Los Angeles
Year of birth missing (living people)